{{Speciesbox
| image = Carabidae - Brachinus crepitans.JPG
| image_caption = Museum specimen
| taxon = Brachinus crepitans
| authority = (Linnaeus, 1758)
| synonyms =
Brachinus abdominaly Dallatorre, 1877 [unav.]
Brachinus altaicus Motschulsky, 1864
Brachinus annulatus Reitter, 1919 [unav.]
Brachinus atripennis Motschulsky, 1864: 215 [suppressed]
Brachinus coerulescens Dallatorre, 1877 [unav.]
Brachinus costatus G.Muller, 1911
Brachinus fallax Apfelbeck, 1904 [nec Peringuey, 1896]
Brachinus femoratus Letzner, 1851 [unav.]
Brachinus fimbriolatus Lucas, 1846
Brachinus flavosuturatus Eichler, 1924
Brachinus gracilis Motschulsky, 1844
Brachinus jeanneli Razet, 1951
Brachinus joenius Patti, 1844Brachinus immaculatus Letzner, 1851 [unav.]Brachinus kirghis Iljin, 1925Brachinus morio Gagliardi, 1941Brachinus nigripennis Letzner, 1851 [unav.]Brachinus obscuricornis Brulle, 1834 [nec Menetries, 1832]Brachinus obscurus Heer, 1837Brachinus rufothoracicus Marcu, 1929Brachinus siculus Patti, 1844Brachinus scoteinus Kolenati,1845Brachinus strepitans Duftschmid, 1812Brachinus sulcatulus Motschulsky, 1850Brachinus tibialis Letzner, 1851 [unav.]Brachinus virescens Letzner, 1851 [unav.]Brachinus virescens Dallatorre, 1877 [unav.]Carabus crepitans Linnaeus, 1758
| synonyms_ref = }}Brachinus crepitans is a species of ground beetle in the Brachininae subfamily that can be found in Europe, central Asia, the Middle East, and northern Africa. 

Etymology
The name of the species derived from a Latin word which means crackle because it makes crackling noise.

Head and protum are brown, while elytrae are greenish. The species is very similar to Brachinus efflans.

Distribution

Ukrainian distribution
In Ukraine the species is found in the steppes of Lviv, near Osovitsa village of Podolian Province in western Ukraine. It is also found in Zolochiv, Kharkiv Oblast.

UK Distribution
The species can be found in southern England and southern Wales where it is abundant in coastal areas. The inland locations have been sited as well through, the most recent of which are Cotswolds and Northamptonshire where it was discovered in limestones. It was also found in boulder clay in Huntingdonshire, and in Brotheridge Green, an old railway line and wildlife reserve that was located near Malvern, Worcestershire. The species was found in the 1970s by Ian L. Crombie.

Ecology

The species fly from May to June. The lifecycle is not known but the larvae are thought to be external parasites that feed on the pupae of other beetle species including Amara convexiuscula and a staphylinid beetle, Tasgius ater'' (Gravenhorst, 1802).

When disturbed, the species shoot liquid from two glands through their anus. Since one of the glands contains hydrogen peroxide and the other hydroquinone, when two the contents mix with enzymes in a "firing chamber", the liquid explodes, and harms the attackers.

Habitat
The species can be found in dry and sunny areas, and usually under stones. It can also be found in calcareous grasslands, arable land, and chalk quarries.

References

External links
Brachinus crepitans
Brachinus crepitans on Flickr

Beetles described in 1758
Beetles of Asia
Beetles of Europe
Taxa named by Carl Linnaeus
Brachininae